Cesare Del Cancia (6 May 1915 – 25 April 2011) was an Italian road cyclist. After finishing fifth in the road race at the 1935 World Championships he turned professional and competed until 1945. He won the 1936 Milano–Torino, 1937 Milan–San Remo and 1938 Giro del Lazio races.

Major results

1933
 1st Giro del Casentino
1936
 1st Milano–Torino
 1st Tre Valli Varesine
1937
 1st Milan–San Remo
 1st Giro dell'Emilia
 2nd Giro del Lazio
 2nd Milano–Torino
 2nd National Road Race Championships
 5th Overall Giro d'Italia
1st Stage 11B
1938
 1st Giro del Lazio
 7th Overall Giro d'Italia
1st Stages 13 & 17
1939
 2nd Giro del Piemonte
 8th Overall Giro d'Italia

References

1915 births
2011 deaths
Italian Giro d'Italia stage winners
Italian male cyclists
Sportspeople from the Province of Pisa
Cyclists from Tuscany